Do Shakhkharat (also Romanized as Do Shakhkharāţ, Dowshkharāţ, Dūshkharāt, Dūsh Kharrāţ, and Doosh Kharrat; also known as Gūshkāreh and Gush Kharād) is a village in Cheshmeh Sar Rural District, in the Central District of Khansar County, Isfahan Province, Iran. At the 2006 census, its population was 1,464, in 378 families.

References 

Populated places in Khansar County